Lukáš Urminský (born 23 July 1992) is a Slovak football goalkeeper who plays for FK Tatran Turzovka.

Club career

Spartak Myjava
He made his Fortuna Liga debut for Spartak Myjava against Senica on 16 May 2015.

References

External links
 
 Eurofotbal profile
 Futbalnet profile

1992 births
Living people
People from Prievidza
Sportspeople from the Trenčín Region
Slovak footballers
Association football goalkeepers
FK Dubnica players
Spartak Myjava players
FK Pohronie players
MFK Ružomberok players
Slovak Super Liga players
2. Liga (Slovakia) players
5. Liga players